This is a list of public schools in the Canadian province of New Brunswick that are currently being used.  Below it is a list of former schools in New Brunswick.

Current School List

Former School List

See also
 List of school districts in New Brunswick
 List of schools in Canada
 List of schools in Moncton

References

External links
 New Brunswick Department of Education School Directory
 Francophone School District Information
 Anglophone School District Information
 New Brunswick School Websites
 New School District Boundaries

 
 
 
Schools